A grand slam champion, also known as a quadruple champion, occurs in different sports when a competitor wins four crowns, titles, medals, belts or another distinction. The definition varies depending on the sport.

Boxing

In boxing, a quadruple champion is a boxer who has won world titles in four different weight classes.

The first ever man to earn that enormous distinction was Thomas Hearns on October 29, 1987. Hearns won his first four titles at the following divisions: Welterweight (147 lbs), Light Middleweight (154 lbs), Middleweight (160 lbs) and Light Heavyweight (175 lbs). By later winning a super middleweight title, he also became the first to win world titles in five weight divisions.

The second man was Ray Charles Leonard, who on November 7, 1998, won his first championships at Welterweight (147 lbs), Light Middleweight (154 lbs), Middleweight (160 lbs), Super Middleweight (168 lbs) and Light Heavyweight (175 lbs). There are five titles in five divisions but his case is extremely rare: Leonard fought for two different belts in two different weight divisions the same night: Super middleweight (168 lbs) and Light heavyweight (175 lbs) against Don Lalonde so any of the titles can be attached as his fourth title.

The legendary Leo Gamez was the first champion to win all the lightest divisions from Minimumweight (105 lbs), Light Flyweight (108 lbs), Flyweight (112 lbs) to Super Flyweight (115 lbs). Gamez did it on October 9, 2000.

Some boxers have managed to win five titles and become Quintuple Champions.

Motor racing
Alain Prost and Sebastian Vettel both won four F1 world championships.

Juha Kankkunen and Tommi Mäkinen both won four World Rally Championships.

Yvan Muller is the only person to win four World Touring Car Championships.

Olivier Gendebien, Henri Pescarolo and Yannick Dalmas have all won the Le Mans 24 hour race four times.

MMA
Cris Cyborg is the only fighter, male or female, to become a Quadruple Champion in MMA, winning belts in the UFC, Bellator MMA, Invicta FC and Strikeforce (mixed martial arts).

See also
List of boxing triple champions
List of boxing quadruple champions
List of boxing quintuple champions
List of boxing sextuple champions
List of boxing septuple champions
List of boxing octuple champions
List of The Ring world champions
List of WBC world champions
List of WBA world champions
List of IBF world champions
List of WBO world champions
List of IBO world champions

External links
Boxrec.com - title search 
Boxing Records 
Saddoboxing 
Yahoo - Boxing 
IBHOF 
Cyberboxingzone 
True Champions Of Boxing 

Boxing champions